Marcus Ebdon (born 17 October 1970) is a Welsh former professional footballer and currently the manager of Spalding United.

Playing career
Born in Pontypool, Wales, Ebdon started his football career as a trainee and then professional with Everton. He spent six years there before moving to Peterborough United in July 1991. During his time with The Posh, Marcus made 147 appearances and scored 15 goals for the club.

March 1997 seen Ebdon move from Peterborough United to Chesterfield, where he was subject of a £100,000 price tag. Ebdon made a total of 192 appearances and scored 13 goals between 1997 and 2003 for club, before moving to Leyton Orient in August 2003.

Ebdon was only briefly with The O's before moving to Staffordshire side Tamworth in November 2003. At the end of the 2005 Conference National, Ebdon retired and went traveling  for a year. In 2006 however, he was called out of retirement to play for Alfreton Town where he was reunited with former Tamworth managers Gary Mills and Darron Gee.

Tamworth
On 22 May 2007, Marcus Ebdon was appointed as Youth Development Officer of Conference North side Tamworth, and again became re-united with Gary Mills and Darron Gee.

Ebdon was named as a substitute for a home league match against Barrow on 15 September 2007, stating the desire of Tamworth to use Marcus as a squad player if needed.

Atherstone Town
On 9 October 2009, it was announced that Ebdon had left The Adders to concentrate on his role with Kettering Town's youth set-up and he had recently become the father of twins.

Managerial career
In January 2007, Ebdon was appointed player/manager of Alfreton Town for the remainder of the season following Darron Gee's decision to join Gary Mills as assistant manager at Tamworth. However, in May 2007 he followed Mills and Gee back to Tamworth, where he was appointed Youth Development Officer.

In June 2012 he joined Spalding United as player/assistant manager, and in November 2015 was appointed manager of the club.

References

External links

1970 births
Living people
Welsh footballers
Everton F.C. players
Wales under-21 international footballers
Peterborough United F.C. players
Chesterfield F.C. players
Leyton Orient F.C. players
Tamworth F.C. players
Alfreton Town F.C. players
Atherstone Town F.C. players
Footballers from Pontypool
Alfreton Town F.C. managers
Spalding United F.C. managers
Association football midfielders
Welsh football managers